Everyday Street Gangsta is the eighth solo studio album (and his tenth overall) by American rapper E.S.G. from Houston, Texas. It was released on September 29, 2009, via E1 Music. The album peaked at #100 on the US Billboard Top R&B/Hip-Hop Albums chart.

Track listing

Charts

References 

2009 albums
E.S.G. (rapper) albums
E1 Music albums